Judith Scott (May 1, 1943 – March 15, 2005) was an American fiber sculptor, born with Down Syndrome and deaf. She was internationally renowned for her art.  In 1987, Judith was enrolled at the Creative Growth Art Center in Oakland, California, which supports people with developmental disabilities. There, Judith discovered her passion and talent for abstract fiber art, and she was able to communicate in a new form. An account of Scott's life, Entwined: Sisters and Secrets in the Silent World of Artist Judith Scott, was written by her twin sister, Joyce Wallace Scott, and was published in 2016.

Biography
Judith was born into a middle-class family in Cincinnati, Ohio on May 1, 1943, along with her fraternal twin sister Joyce. Unlike Joyce, Judith was born with Down Syndrome. During her infancy, Judith had Scarlet Fever, which caused her to lose her hearing, a fact that remained unknown until much later on in her life.

Judith Scott spent her first seven and a half years at home with her parents, twin sister and older brothers. Although the developmental gap between the two girls was apparent, "the parents consciously sought to treat these youngest members of the family alike."

However, when it was time for the girls to start attending school, Judith was found to be "ineducable." There was only one classroom for children with disabilities, and Judith was not able to pass the verbally-based entrance tests, due to her still undiagnosed deafness. Consequently, on medical advice, her parents placed Judith in the Columbus State Institution (formerly the Columbus State School), an institution for mentally disabled people, on October 18, 1950. This separation had a profound effect on both twins.

The records from Judith Scott's first few years at the Institution indicate that she had an IQ of 30 (based upon oral testing before her deafness was recognized). For this reason she was denied any training opportunities. Deprived of her twin, Judith became severely alienated, and behavioral problems soon surfaced. Her Clinical Record states that "She does not seem to be in good contact with her environment. She does not get along well with other children, is restless, eats messily, tears her clothing, and beats other children. Her presence on the ward is a disturbing influence." Soon after, she was moved to a smaller state institution at Gallipolis, Ohio.

In 1985, after 35 years of complete separation and lengthy and difficult negotiations, Joyce Scott became her sister's legal guardian, and brought Judith to live with her in California, a state where all mentally disabled citizens are entitled to an ongoing education.

Judith Scott died of natural causes at her sister's home in Dutch Flat, California, a few weeks short of her 62nd birthday. She outlived her life expectancy at birth by almost fifty years.

Art
On April 1, 1987, Judith Scott began attending the Creative Growth Art Center in Oakland, one of the first organizations in the world to provide studio space for artists with disabilities. For almost two years, Judith showed little interest in any artistic activity. She was unexceptional with paint. She scribbled loops and circles, but her work contained no representational imagery, and she was so uninterested in creating that the staff was considering ending her involvement with the program.

It wasn't until Judith casually observed a fiber art class conducted by visiting artist Sylvia Seventy, that she had her artistic breakthrough. Using the materials at hand, Judith spontaneously invented her own unique and radically different form of artistic expression. While other students were stitching, she was sculpting with an unprecedented zeal and concentration.

Her creative gifts and absolute focus were quickly recognized, and she was given complete freedom to choose her own materials. Taking whatever objects she found, regardless of ownership, she would wrap them in carefully selected colored yarns to create diverse sculptures of many different shapes. Some resemble cocoons or body parts, while others are elongated totemic poles. Many of her works also feature pairs, reflecting Scott's experience as a twin. Judith worked on her art five days a week for eighteen years, producing over 200 pieces in total.

Judith had her first exhibition in 1999, which coincided with the publication of John MacGregor's book Metamorphosis: The Fiber Art of Judith Scott. Together, these events helped propel her to worldwide recognition.

Collections 
Scott's work has become immensely popular in the world of outsider art, and her pieces sell for substantial sums. Scott is now hailed as a contemporary artist, no longer just an outsider. Her art is held in the permanent collections of many museums, including:  Museum of Modern Art (Manhattan, New York), the American Visionary Art Museum (Baltimore, Maryland), San Francisco Museum of Modern Art, Museum of American Folk Art (Manhattan, New York), Intuit: The Center for Intuitive and Outsider Art (Chicago, Illinois), Irish Museum of Modern Art, Dublin, The Oakland Museum, Oakland, CA. L'Aracine Musee D'Art Brut (Paris, France), Art Brut Connaissance & Diffusion Collection (Paris and Prague), Collection de l'art brut (Lausanne, Switzerland).

Filmography

Exhibitions

Below is a list of select notable exhibitions for Judith Scott.

Solo exhibitions 

 2018 –  Judith Scott: Touchdown, Creative Growth Art Center, Oakland, California
 2014-15 – Bound and Unbound, Brooklyn Museum, Brooklyn, New York
 2009 – Judith Scott: Retrospective, Ricco Maresca Gallery, New York City, New York
 2002 – Cocoon: Judith Scott, Ricco-Maresca Gallery, New York City, New York

Group exhibitions 

 2019 – Memory Palaces: Inside the Collection of Audrey B. Heckler, American Folk Art Museum, New York City, New York
 2019 – The Doors of Perception, Curated by Javier Téllez in collaboration with the Outsider Art Fair, Frieze Art Fair, New York City, New York
 2019 – Flying High: Women Artists of Art Brut, Bank Austria Kunstforum, Vienna
 2018 – Outliers and American Vanguard Art, National Gallery of Art, Washington DC
 2017 – Forget Me Not: Judith Scott, Zuckerman Museum of Art, Kennesaw, Georgia
 2017 – Viva Arte Viva, the 57th Venice Biennale, Venice, Italy
 2015 – Collection ABCD, La Maison Rouge, Paris, France
 2013 – Create, Creative Growth Art Center, Oakland, California
 2013 – Create, Boca Raton Museum of Art, Boca Raton, Florida
 2013 – Extreme Art, The Aldrich Contemporary Art Museum, Ridgefield, Connecticut 
 2012 – Rosemarie Trockel: A Cosmos, New Museum of Contemporary Art, New York City, New York
 2011 – World Transformers, Schirn Kunsthalle Frankfurt, Frankfurt, Germany
 2000 – Visions, American Visionary Art Museum, Baltimore, Maryland
 2005 – Creative Growth, The Ricky Jay Broadside Collection, Yerba Buena Center for the Arts, San Francisco, California

References

Further reading
Mullin, Rick, "Sculpture", American Arts Quarterly, Fall 2010
Joyce Wallace Scott, "Entwined:Sisters and Secrets in the Silent World of Artist Judith Scott", Beacon Press
"Judith Scott - Bound and Unbound" Brooklyn Museum, 2015

External links

 Judith Scott profile, Creative Growth Art Center
Clip from 'Outsider : The Life and Art of Judith Scott' a film by Betsy Bayha

1943 births
2005 deaths
Deaf artists
Outsider artists
Women outsider artists
American textile artists
20th-century American women artists
21st-century American women artists
People with Down syndrome
Artists from the San Francisco Bay Area
Women textile artists
American deaf people